Burwood Cemetery is a cemetery in Burwood, Victoria in Australia. It dates back to 1858, and was originally known as Nunawading General Cemetery. It is known as a resting place of notable figures from Melbourne. The site is operated by Greater Metropolitan Cemeteries Trust, who also manage eighteen other cemeteries and memorial parks around Victoria, including Preston Cemetery, Fawkner Memorial Park, Altona Memorial Park and Coburg Pine Ridge Cemetery.

Notable interments
 Frank Cumbrae-Stewart, barrister and university professor
 Zina Cumbrae-Stewart, philanthropist
 John S. Clark, Scottish-born Australian entomologist and myrmecologist
 Harold Edward Elliott, soldier and politician
 Sir Charles Powers, High Court judge
 Percival Serle, historian, biographer, bibliographer
 F. W. Thring, film-maker and entrepreneur
 E. W. Tipping, journalist
 Mervyn Allanson Henry Kelaart, Ceylon (Sri Lanka) cricketer, first class

War graves
The cemetery contains the war graves of fifty-four Commonwealth service personnel. There are eight from World War I and forty-six from World War II.

References

External links
 Burwood Cemetery – Billion Graves

1857 establishments in Australia
Cemeteries in Melbourne
Commonwealth War Graves Commission cemeteries in Australia
Buildings and structures in the City of Whitehorse